Introducing Kafka, also known as R. Crumb's Kafka, is an illustrated biography of Franz Kafka by David Zane Mairowitz and Robert Crumb. The book includes comic adaptations of some of Kafka's most famous works including The Metamorphosis, A Hunger Artist, In the Penal Colony, and The Judgment, as well as brief sketches of his three novels The Trial, The Castle, and Amerika. The book also details Kafka's biography in a format that is part illustrated essay, part sequential comic panels.

Publication history 
The book was released as part of the "Introducing..." series by Totem Books; the popularity of Crumb's renditions of Kafka's works led to additional printings under the title R. Crumb's Kafka, and its most recent edition by Fantagraphics Books (2007) is simply titled Kafka.

Content
The book focuses on the biographical details of Kafka's life, interspersed with illustrated vignettes from his writing. The author relates Kafka's personality and various incidents in his life to the composition of his stories. For example, Kafka's complicated relationship with his family is linked to stories where the main character is an animal – notably The Metamorphosis, whose protagonist, Gregor Samsa, awakens to find himself transformed into a giant bug, and becomes a burden on his family.

Editions

 Mairowitz, David Zane (writer) and Robert Crumb (illustrator). Introducing Kafka. New York: Totem Books, 1993.  
 Mairowitz, David Zane (writer) and Robert Crumb (illustrator). R. Crumb's Kafka. iBooks Graphic Novels, 2005. 
 Mairowitz, David Zane (writer) and Robert Crumb (illustrator). Kafka. Fantagraphics Books, 2007.

References

Works about Franz Kafka
Cultural depictions of Franz Kafka
Non-fiction graphic novels
Biographies about writers
Biographical comics
Educational comics
1993 in comics
Comics based on real people
Comics by Robert Crumb
Prague in fiction
Comics set in the 19th century
Comics set in the 1900s
Comics set in the 1910s
Comics set in the 1920s
Comics set in the Czech Republic